Bitragunta railway station (station code:BTTR) is an Indian Railways station located at Bitragunta town of Nellore district, in the Indian state of Andhra Pradesh. It is under the administration of Vijayawada railway division of South Coast Railway zone.

History 
In 1968, the classification yard was established and later a wagon-repair depot, which was in operation till 1998. There was also Bitragunta Railway Institute (formerly Western Culture Institute).

Classification 
In terms of earnings and outward passengers handled, Bitragunta is categorized as a Non-Suburban Grade-5 (NSG-5) railway station. Based on the re–categorization of Indian Railway stations for the period of 2017–18 and 2022–23, an NSG–5 category station earns between – crore and handles  passengers.

References 

Vijayawada railway division
Railway stations in Prakasam district